Sebastián Rodríguez may refer to:

 Sebastián Rodríguez de Villaviciosa (1618–1663), Spanish dramatist
 Sebastián Rodríguez Veloso (born 1957), Spanish Paralympic swimmer
 Pablo Sebastián Rodríguez (born 1978), Argentine basketball player
 Sebastián Rodríguez (footballer) (born 1992), Uruguayan footballer